The discography of Flight of the Conchords, a New Zealand-based comedy band, consists of two studio albums, one live album, two compilation albums, one extended play (EP) and seven singles. Jemaine Clement and Bret McKenzie formed Flight of the Conchords in Wellington in 1998. Their first release was the live album Folk the World Tour, which the duo self-released in 2002. In 2006, the band signed with American independent label Sub Pop; they released the EP The Distant Future the following year, which reached number eight in New Zealand.

Clement and McKenzie began starring in the Flight of the Conchords TV series on HBO in June 2007. After the conclusion of the first season of the show, the band's self-titled debut full-length album was released in April 2008, which topped the New Zealand Albums Chart and reached number three on the US Billboard 200. Similarly, following the conclusion of the show's second season, I Told You I Was Freaky was released in October 2009, reaching the top ten in New Zealand and the top 20 in the US. The lead single from the album, "Hurt Feelings", became the band's first to chart when it reached number 36 on the New Zealand Singles Chart.

Flight of the Conchords returned in 2012 with the release of "Feel Inside (And Stuff Like That)", a charity single recorded to benefit the New Zealand children's charity Cure Kids. The single topped the New Zealand Singles Chart. The compilation album The Complete Collection, featuring The Distant Future, Flight of the Conchords, I Told You I Was Freaky and "Pencils in the Wind", was released in 2013. Their live album, Live in London, was released in March 2019.

Albums

Studio albums

Live albums

Compilation albums

Extended plays

Singles

Other charted songs

References

External links
Flight of the Conchords official website
Flight of the Conchords discography at Discogs
Flight of the Conchords discography at MusicBrainz

Discography
Discographies of New Zealand artists
Comedian discographies